Clancy O'Connor is an American actor who played Edward Rutledge in John Adams, a 2008 television miniseries.

He graduated from Smoky Valley High School of Lindsborg, Kansas in 2000, then spent two years at the University of Kansas studying drama. He attended the Juilliard School's drama division as a member of Group 35 (between 2002 and 2006), where he graduated with a Bachelor of Fine Arts degree in 2006.

O'Connor has made television appearances in John Adams, Law & Order: Criminal Intent, I Just Want My Pants Back and Smash.

He was also the understudy for Michael Urie in the Off-Broadway play Buyer & Cellar in 2014.

He is openly gay.

Filmography

References

External links
 

1980s births
Living people
American gay actors
University of Kansas alumni
Juilliard School alumni
21st-century American male actors
People from Lindsborg, Kansas
21st-century LGBT people